Jordan Nicolas Mohilowski is an American songwriter, producer and multi-instrumentalist, based in Nashville, Tennessee.  He is the drummer for the Contemporary Christian Music band The Afters as well as a songwriter and producer. He is currently signed to Disney Music Publishing in partnership with pop songwriters/producers Emanuel Kiriakou and E. Kidd Bogart. Jordan is a GMA Dove Award winner and has received multiple BMI Awards for having some of the most performed songs on U.S. Christian radio.

Discography (selected)

Awards
 2015 BMI Award for "Broken Hallelujah"
 2014 GMA Dove Award (Inspirational Recorded Song Of The Year) for "You Amaze Us"
 2012 BMI Award for "Lift Me Up"
 2009 BMI Award for "Be Still"

References

External links
Jordan Mohilowski on Twitter

American rock drummers
Living people
1984 births
21st-century American drummers